Syringa × persica, the Persian lilac, is a  hybrid, thought to originate from a cross of  Syringa × laciniata and S. afghanica. Persian lilac prefers warmer winter climates (hardiness zones 5–9) than many species of lilac. Its hybrid with  S. vulgaris, the common lilac, is S. x chinensis, sometimes called Rouen lilac.

This is a different plant than Melia azedarach, also sometimes called Persian lilac.

References 
 Flora of Pakistan: Syringa × persica

External links 
 
 

Flora of Iran
Hybrid plants
persica